The Train may refer to:

Films
 The Train (1964 film), an American war film starring Burt Lancaster and Paul Scofield
 The Train (1970 film), an Indian Hindi suspense film
 The Train (1973 film), a Franco–Italian war film
 The Train (2007 film), an Indian Hindi thriller
 The Train (2011 film), an Indian Malayalam thriller

Games
 The Train: Escape to Normandy, a 1988 action video game based on the 1964 film (see above)
 The Train Game, a 1983 train simulation video game

Literature
 "The Train" (short story), a 1947 story by Flannery O'Connor
 The Train (Russian: Sputniki, Fellow Travellers), novel by Vera Panova

Music
 "The Train" (song), a song by OutKast
 "The Train", a song by Ray Charles, the B-side of "Let's Go Get Stoned"
 "The Train", a song by Frankie Miller from Double Trouble
 "The Train", a song by Irving Berlin
 "The Train", a 1969 song by 1910 Fruitgum Company
 "C'mon N' Ride It (The Train)", a song by Quad City DJ's

Television
 "The Train" (Date with the Angels)
 "The Train" (Dr. Quinn, Medicine Woman)
 "The Train" (Mission: Impossible)
 "The Train" (XIII: The Series)

See also
 Train (disambiguation)